What Did You Do For Summer Break is an EP by American songwriter M Ross Perkins. It was released in digital format on August 31, 2018 on SofaBurn Records.

Track listing
All songs composed and arranged by M Ross Perkins.

 "Bed Sheet Wing" – 4:20
 "I'm Going Out to See My Baby" – 3:36
 "When You're Near Me" – 3:38
 "Hopscotch for the Animal Parade" – 4:49
 "Restless Amy" – 3:25
 "Don't Call Your Ride" – 4:46

Personnel
 M Ross Perkins – all voices, instruments, and production

References

2018 EPs
M Ross Perkins albums